Fairview is an unincorporated community and census-designated place (CDP) located within Middletown Township, in Monmouth County, New Jersey, United States. As of the 2010 United States Census, the CDP's population was 3,806.

Geography
According to the United States Census Bureau, the CDP had a total area of 1.289 square miles (3.337 km2), including 1.280 square miles (3.314 km2) of land and 0.009 square miles (0.023 km2) of water (0.69%).

Demographics

Census 2010

Census 2000
At the 2000 United States Census there were 3,942 people, 1,331 households and 1,095 families living in the CDP. The population density was 3,067.7 per square mile (1,189.1/km2). There were 1,344 housing units at an average density of 1,045.9/sq mi (405.4/km2). The racial makeup of the CDP was 95.92% White, 0.56% African American, 1.98% Asian, 0.03% Pacific Islander, 0.46% from other races, and 1.07% from two or more races. Hispanic or Latino of any race were 4.06% of the population.

There were 1,331 households, of which 42.5% had children under the age of 18 living with them, 71.5% were married couples living together, 7.7% had a female householder with no husband present, and 17.7% were non-families. 14.0% of all households were made up of individuals, and 6.2% had someone living alone who was 65 years of age or older. The average household size was 2.96 and the average family size was 3.29.

The age distribution was 27.6% under the age of 18, 6.3% from 18 to 24, 31.3% from 25 to 44, 25.0% from 45 to 64, and 9.9% who were 65 years of age or older. The median age was 37 years. For every 100 females, there were 99.9 males. For every 100 females age 18 and over, there were 96.9 males.

The median household income was $81,733, and the median family income was $85,993. Males had a median income of $65,986 versus $31,510 for females. The per capita income was $29,914. About 1.8% of families and 1.8% of the population were below the poverty line, including 2.3% of those under age 18 and 1.3% of those age 65 or over.

Transportation
New Jersey Transit offers local bus service on the 834 route. New Jersey Route 35 is a major highway in Fairview linking the CDP to Red Bank and Keyport.

References

Census-designated places in Monmouth County, New Jersey
Middletown Township, New Jersey